Icon Football Club is an American soccer team based in Montville, New Jersey. It was announced in May 2014 the club would join the professional American Soccer League beginning with the 2014-15 season.

Icon FC competed in the Garden State Soccer League, a United States Adult Soccer Association fifth-tier league from 2010-14.

U.S. Open Cup 
The club is best known for their performances in the 2013 Lamar Hunt U.S. Open Cup which they qualified for by advancing to the final of the 2013 USASA Region I National Cup. Their striker, Argjent Duka (brother of Chicago Fire midfielder Dilly Duka), finished tied for third among the top scorers with four goals in two matches.

U.S. Open Cup results

Season-by-season

References

External links 
 Icon FC website
 American Soccer League website

American Soccer League (2014–2017) teams
Soccer clubs in New Jersey
Soccer clubs in the New York metropolitan area
2010 establishments in New Jersey
Association football clubs established in 2010